The Salt Creek tiger beetle  (Cicindela nevadica lincolniana) is a critically  endangered subspecies of tiger beetle endemic to the saline wetlands of northern Lancaster County, Nebraska, adjacent to and immediately to the north of the city of Lincoln.  It is a predatory insect, using its mandibles to catch other insects.  The beetle is one of the rarest insects in North America; surveys showed that 194 adults existed in 2009, down from 263 in 2008, and 777 in 2000. However, efforts are continuing to boost the population, which in 2013 numbered 365 beetles: one beetle for each day in a regular year.

Description
The Salt Creek tiger beetle measures about 12 mm (0.5 in.) in length.  The beetle has a metallic brown to dark olive green coloration, with a dark metallic green underside.  Its body form and color pattern differs from other tiger beetle subspecies.

Life cycle
Little is known about the life cycle of the Salt Creek tiger beetle.  Adults emerge around June 1 and disappear five or six weeks later; populations peak about two weeks after the beetles' initial emergence.  After mating, the beetles lay eggs in sloping, muddy, saline soil.

Upon hatching, the larva constructs a burrow.  The larva is a voracious feeder, capturing prey that wanders too close to the burrow.  During the larval stage, the beetle will molt multiple times (the precise number is unknown, but most other tiger beetles have three larval stages).  If a three-stage cycle does exist, it is likely that the Salt Creek tiger beetle spends over a year in the third larval stage.

The larva prepares for its pupation by digging a side chamber and sealing the burrow entrance.

Habitat
The beetle is found at Arbor Lake, and along the banks of Salt Creek and its tributaries and in the mud flats of saline marshes of northern Lancaster County.  Its historical range is believed to have included similar habitat in extreme southern Saunders County.  Much of this habitat has been degraded or destroyed by drainage of the salt marshes for agriculture or development and by runoff from surrounding farms and the city of Lincoln.

Conservation
Interest in the Salt Creek tiger beetle began with surveys conducted by the University of Nebraska–Lincoln in the mid-1980s.  These surveys indicated that the beetle was quite rare; an in-depth study of the beetle began in 1991.  The beetle was added to the Nebraska endangered species lists in the 1990s.  On October 6, 2005, the U.S. Fish and Wildlife Service listed the beetle as an endangered species under the federal Endangered Species Act.

From 1991 to 2005, the number of sites containing Salt Creek tiger beetles declined from six to three, on 35 acres.

On May 5, 2014, the U.S. Fish and Wildlife Service published its "final rule" on critical habitat for the beetle in the Federal Register, designating 1,110 acres for conservation effective June 5, 2014.  Established areas include saline wetlands along Little Salt Creek, Rock Creek, Oak Creek and Haines Branch Creek in Lancaster County, with a goal of supporting at least six populations. 

A similar recovery plan was published in 2017. The U.S. Fish and Wildlife Service has indicated they will downgrade its status from endangered to threatened once there are between 500 and 1,000 individuals in each of three protected zones, alongside additional habitat criteria.

See also
Platte River caddisfly

References

External links

UNL Department of Entomology - Salt Creek Tiger Beetle
Salt Creek Tiger Beetle - U.S. Fish & Wildlife Service
F&WS endangered species listing press release

Cicindela
Fauna of Nebraska
Endangered fauna of the United States
Critically endangered insects
Beetles of North America
ESA endangered species